The Sawley map, formerly known as the Henry of Mainz map, is the earliest surviving mappa mundi (world map) made in England. It was made between about 1180 and the early 13th century. The map is the frontispiece of a copy of the Imago mundi of Honorius of Autun. It is oriented with east (and the Garden of Eden) at the top and the island of Delos at the centre.

The map takes up the second page (folio 1v) of manuscript 66 at Corpus Christi College, Cambridge. The first folio is of thicker vellum than the rest of the manuscript. The manuscript was probably copied at Durham Priory before being given to Sawley Abbey (now in Lancashire) in the early 13th century. The map is oval in shape, with winged figures (angels, not winds) decorating the four corners of the rectangular page. Across the top of the page is a faint ex libris in Latin: Liber s[an]c[t]e Marie de Salleia, 'book of Saint Mary's of Sawley'.

The map depicts three continents – Asia, Africa and Europe – surrounded by a world ocean. It is in colour, with green representing the ocean and purple the rivers. Mountains are depicted as series of red lobes. Places are marked by circles, square and pictographic symbols, such as towers or, in the case of Jerusalem, a temple. Delos, at the centre, was noted for its pagan temples. It is depicted as a circle surrounded by smaller circles (the Cyclades). The Orkneys are depicted in the same way.

The Sawley map is usually grouped with other encyclopaedic mappae mundi of the same period, such as the Hereford map and Ebstorf map (since destroyed). It contains much fanciful material and many pieces of information derived from the Bible and the classics. It may belong to a northern French tradition, if it was copied from the mappa mundi which Bishop Hugh of Le Puiset bequeathed to Durham Priory in 1195.

The misattribution of the map to Henry of Mainz, possibly the future Archbishop Henry I, stems from a misreading of the prologue, which states that this version of the Imago mundi was edited by Henry in 1110. It does not mention the map, which is not an integral part of the Imago but was created decades later. Whether or not the Cambridge MS. 66 version of the text was even edited by any Henry of Mainz has been challenged. No other manuscript of the Imago contains a copy of the Sawley map or one like it. The only thing that can be said for certain of the connection between the Sawley map and the accompanying text is that they could be found bound together at Sawley shortly after 1200.

Notes

Bibliography

External links
Virtual Mappa 2.0 — contains an annotated Sawley map

12th-century maps
Historic maps of the world